Luís Carlos Eneas da Conceição Lima (born 15 June 1987), known as just Luís Carlos, is a Brazilian footballer playing as a winger for Doxa Katokopias.

Career
On 11 August 2013 he signed two-year deal with Polish Ekstraklasa club, Zawisza Bydgoszcz.

Honours

with Zawisza Bydgoszcz
 Polish SuperCup Winner (2014)
 Polish Cup Winner (2013/14)

References

External links 
 

1987 births
Living people
Brazilian footballers
Esporte Clube Santo André players
Gil Vicente F.C. players
Sociedade Esportiva do Gama players
Esporte Clube Noroeste players
América Futebol Clube (SP) players
Centro Sportivo Alagoano players
Zawisza Bydgoszcz players
Korona Kielce players
Zagłębie Lubin players
Moreirense F.C. players
Primeira Liga players
Ekstraklasa players
C.F. União players
Liga Portugal 2 players
Expatriate footballers in Portugal
Brazilian expatriates in Portugal
Expatriate footballers in Poland
Brazilian expatriates in Poland
Association football wingers